Country for Old Men is an album by American jazz guitarist John Scofield. It earned Scofield a Grammy Award for Best Jazz Instrumental Album. It features longtime Scofield collaborators Larry Goldings on piano & organ, bass guitarist Steve Swallow and drummer Bill Stewart. Impulse! released the album on September 23, 2016.

Background
The album features jazz versions of country music songs. The title was borrowed from the poem by WB Yeats, "Sailing to Byzantium"; the line was used as the title of the novel No Country for Old Men (2005) by Cormac McCarthy which was adapted into a 2007 film; this is also a joke about Scofield's age (he was 64 when the album was recorded; his longtime bassist Steve Swallow was 76). The album was recorded on April 3 and 4, 2016 in the Carriage House Studios in Stamford, Connecticut.

Reception
Evan Haga of JazzTimes stated, "John Scofield’s latest project, a set of C&W standards, is full of surprises even if its concept might seem overdue for the guitarist, whose abiding love of American roots music is no secret. Rather than bend toward the idiom he’s exploring, as he did on the fruitful gospel exercise Piety Street, from 2009, here Scofield often pulls his chosen country classics into small-group postbop." John Kelman of All About Jazz wrote, "The music is always what matters most, of course; but when it's possible to marry stellar playing with superb sound, the result is something as glorious for the ears as it is the head, the heart and the soul...all of which Country for Old Men possesses, in spades. And, beyond the lyrical, country-tinged ballads and fiery swingers, Country for Old Men saves its biggest surprises for its final minutes..." John Fordham of The Guardian added, "Occasionally there’s a disconnect between the convivial lilt of some of these tunes and the jazz grooves, but Scofield at full jazz-improv pelt is always something to behold."

Track listing

Personnel
 John Scofield – guitar, ukulele
 Larry Goldings – piano, Hammond organ
 Steve Swallow – bass guitar
 Bill Stewart – drums

References

2016 albums
Instrumental albums
John Scofield albums